Drugs, God and the New Republic is the second album by the band Warrior Soul released in 1991. It was the first album without drummer Paul Ferguson, who had been replaced by Mark Evans. The band supported the album by taking part in the "Tune in, Turn on, Burn out Tour", with the Sisters of Mercy, Public Enemy, Young Black Teenagers, and Gang of Four.

The album was remastered and re-released with bonus tracks by Escapi Music in 2006.

Production
The album was produced by Geoff Workman and the band. "Interzone" is a cover of the Joy Division song.

Critical reception

The Indianapolis Star concluded that "hard-rock fans are getting another dose of an unusually intense form of angst." The Calgary Herald wrote that "singer Kory Clarke's lyrics can be flatulent at times, but more often his articulate anger is rare among hard-rockers, blending powerfully with the music, a fist thrust upward through the belly of the American dream."

The Ottawa Citizen stated that "the music is a fire storm of screaming guitars and thundering drums." The Chicago Tribune opined: "This is the roller-coaster world of Relevant Metal; one minute you've got a geopolitical ax to grind, two minutes later you're in the pool with no shorts on, paddling toward the girls in the shallow end."

Track listing 

 "Intro" - 2:49
 "Interzone" - 2:59
 "Drugs, God And The New Republic" - 5:17
 "The Answer" - 4:08
 "Rocket 88" - 2:38
 "Jump For Joy" - 5:51
 "My Time" - 3:47
 "Real Thing" - 3:38
 "Man Must Live As One" - 3:36
 "Hero" - 4:50
 "The Wasteland" - 4:29
 "Children Of The Winter" - 5:50
 "Intro (live)" - 4:37  [2006 Escapi Bonus Track] 
 "Interzone (live) - 2:30  [2006 Escapi Bonus Track] 
 "The Answer (live) - 4:16 [2006 Escapi Bonus Track]

Personnel
 Kory Clarke - lead vocals
 John Ricco - guitar
 Pete McClanahan - bass guitar
 Mark Evans - drums

Production
Mastered by George Marino at Sterling Sound, NYC

References

Warrior Soul albums
1991 albums
DGC Records albums
Albums produced by Don Fury